Dobl Transmitter was a facility for medium wave broadcasting at Dobl, Styria, Austria, built in 1939–1941. It used as antenna a 156-metre (511 ft) high guyed mast of lattice steel, which was guyed in two levels at 113 and 73 metres (371 and 240 ft). Dobl Transmitter was shut down in 1984 and is now a technical museum.

External links
 Dobl Transmitter
 
 http://www.skyscraperpage.com/diagrams/?b58038

Radio in Austria
Museums in Styria
Telecommunications museums
Towers completed in 1941
1941 establishments in Austria
20th-century architecture in Austria